Concordat of 1929 may refer to:

 Lateran Treaty, between the Holy See and the Kingdom of Italy
 Prussian Concordat, between the Holy See and the Free State of Prussia